Helopsaltes is a genus of passerine birds in the grassbird family Locustellidae.

A comprehensive molecular phylogenetic study of the grassbird family Locustellidae published in 2018 found that the genus Locustella consisted of two distinct clades. The genus was split and six species were moved to the newly erected genus Helopsaltes with Pallas's grasshopper warbler (Helopsaltes certhiola) as the type species. The genus name combines the Ancient Greek ἕλος/helos meaning "marshy ground" and ψάλτης/psaltis "a chanter".

The genus contains the following species:

 Sakhalin grasshopper warbler (Helopsaltes amnicola)
 Gray's grasshopper warbler (Helopsaltes fasciolatus)
 Marsh grassbird (Helopsaltes pryeri)
 Pallas's grasshopper warbler (Helopsaltes certhiola)
 Styan's grasshopper warbler (Helopsaltes pleskei)
 Middendorff's grasshopper warbler (Helopsaltes ochotensis)

References

 
Bird genera